The Soviet Hockey Championship was the highest level ice hockey league in the Soviet Union, running from 1946 to 1992. Before the 1940s the game of ice hockey was not cultivated in Russia, instead the more popular form of hockey was bandy. Following the dissolution of the USSR, the league was temporarily renamed the CIS Championship in 1992. This organization was the direct predecessor of the International Hockey League, and subsequent Russian Superleague (RSL) and current Kontinental Hockey League (KHL).

History
The Soviet Championship League began in 1946, with 12 teams playing 7 games each. Teams were based in Arkhangelsk, Kaunas, Leningrad, Moscow, Riga, Sverdlovsk, Tallinn and Uzhhorod, and eight of them were from the military or police. The teams were populated with amateur players who were actually full-time athletes hired as regular workers of a company (aircraft industry, food workers, tractor industry) or organization (KGB, Red Army, Soviet Air Force) that sponsored what would be presented as an after-hours social sports society hockey team for their workers. In other words, all Soviet hockey players were de facto professionals who circumvented the amateur rules of the International Olympic Committee to retain their amateur status and compete in the Olympics.

The league was dominated by Moscow-based teams, who won every title in the league's existence. Far and away the most dominant club in league history was HC CSKA Moscow, the famous "Red Army Team," which won 32 titles, including all but six from 1955 to 1989 and 13 in a row from 1976 to 1989. CSKA was able to pull off such a long run of dominance because during the Soviet era, the entire CSKA organization was a functioning division of the Soviet Armed Forces via the Ministry of Defence. As all able-bodied Soviet males had to serve in the military, the team was able to literally draft the best young hockey players in the Soviet Union onto the team. All players were commissioned officers in the Soviet Army. There was a substantial overlap between the rosters of the Red Army Team and the Soviet national team, which was one factor behind the Soviets' near-absolute dominance of international hockey from the 1950s through the early 1990s. By the late 1980s, however, the long run of Red Army dominance caused a significant dropoff in attendance throughout the league.

Soviet League Champions 
 1947 – Dynamo Moscow
 1948 – CSKA Moscow
 1949 – CSKA Moscow
 1950 – CSKA Moscow
 1951 – VVS Moscow
 1952 – VVS Moscow
 1953 – VVS Moscow
 1954 – Dynamo Moscow
 1955 – CSKA Moscow
 1956 – CSKA Moscow
 1957 – Krylya Sovetov Moscow
 1958 – CSKA Moscow
 1959 – CSKA Moscow
 1960 – CSKA Moscow
 1961 – CSKA Moscow
 1962 – HC Spartak Moscow
 1963 – CSKA Moscow
 1964 – CSKA Moscow
 1965 – CSKA Moscow
 1966 – CSKA Moscow
 1967 – HC Spartak Moscow
 1968 – CSKA Moscow
 1969 – HC Spartak Moscow
 1970 – CSKA Moscow
 1971 – CSKA Moscow
 1972 – CSKA Moscow
 1973 – CSKA Moscow
 1974 – Krylya Sovetov Moscow
 1975 – CSKA Moscow
 1976 – HC Spartak Moscow
 1977 – CSKA Moscow
 1978 – CSKA Moscow
 1979 – CSKA Moscow
 1980 – CSKA Moscow
 1981 – CSKA Moscow
 1982 – CSKA Moscow
 1983 – CSKA Moscow
 1984 – CSKA Moscow
 1985 – CSKA Moscow
 1986 – CSKA Moscow
 1987 – CSKA Moscow
 1988 – CSKA Moscow
 1989 – CSKA Moscow
 1990 – Dynamo Moscow
 1991 – Dynamo Moscow
 1992 – Dynamo Moscow

See also
Soviet Cup (ice hockey)
Russian Open Hockey Championship
Russian Elite Hockey Scoring Champion
Russian Elite Hockey Goal Scoring Champion
Soviet MVP (ice hockey)
Super Series

References

Bibliography

External links
Soviet Union Championship 
Sports123: Ice Hockey, Men: Soviet Union Championship

1
 
Ice hockey